The Greek Tycoon is a 1978 American biographical romantic drama film, of the roman à clef type, directed by J. Lee Thompson. The screenplay by Morton S. Fine is based on a story by Fine, Nico Mastorakis, and Win Wells, who loosely based it on Aristotle Onassis and his relationship with Jacqueline Kennedy.  Mastorakis denied this, instead stating "We're not doing a film about Aristotle Onassis.  It's a personification of all Greek Tycoons." The film stars Anthony Quinn in the title role and Jacqueline Bisset as the character based on Kennedy. Quinn also appeared in Thompson's picture The Passage, released the following year.

Plot
The film focuses on the courtship and marriage of aging Greek Theo Tomasis, who rose from his humble peasant roots to become an influential mogul who owns oil tankers, airlines, and Mediterranean islands and longs to be elected President of Greece, and considerably younger Liz Cassidy, the beautiful widow of the assassinated President of the United States. The two first meet when she is visiting his island estate with her husband James, the charismatic Senator from the state of Massachusetts. Theo immediately is attracted to her and, despite the fact she obviously is happily married, begins to woo her aboard his yacht while her husband is deep in conversation with the former Prime Minister of the United Kingdom. As the plot unfolds, Theo's beloved son Nico dies in an accident, his wife Simi commits suicide, James becomes President and appoints his brother John Attorney General, and Theo ends his affair with Paola to comfort and eventually marry grieving widow Liz.

Cast
Anthony Quinn as Theo Tomasis (Aristotle Onassis)
Jacqueline Bisset as Liz Cassidy (Jacqueline "Jackie" Bouvier Kennedy Onassis)
James Franciscus as James Cassidy (John F. Kennedy)
Edward Albert as Nico Tomasis (Alexander S. Onassis)
Camilla Sparv as Simi Tomasis (Athina Niarchos Onassis Spencer-Churchill Livanos)
Marilù Tolo as Sophia Matalas (Maria Callas)
Charles Durning as Michael Russell
Luciana Paluzzi as Paola Scotti 
Roland Culver as Robert Keith (Winston Churchill)
Robin Clarke as John Cassidy (Robert "Bobby" F. Kennedy)
Kathryn Leigh Scott as Nancy Cassidy

Production
Producer Nico Mastorakis reportedly offered Jackie Onassis $1 million to play herself in a film called Tycoon. She refused. When Christina Onassis declined to give permission for the movie, Mastorakis changed it to be "fictional".

Quinn said that he met Onassis six months before the latter's death and the tycoon gave his blessing to Quinn's casting. Quinn said Jackie Kennedy asked him to not make the movie. Quinn originally decided not to do it but then changed his mind after Jackie snubbed him at a restaurant.

Filming started 1 October 1976 with a reported budget of $4 million. Quinn was paid $500,000 and Bissett $250,000.

The film was shot on location in New York City, Athens, Mykonos, Corfu, Washington, D.C., and London.

The film's theme song, "(Life is) Just a Dance with Time," was written by John Kongos and recorded by Petula Clark in both English and French (as "Le Grec").

In September 1977 Universal bought the film for a reported $8 million.

Release

Critical reception
The film opened to negative reviews, for the jet set films of the time were losing audience attention and box office receipts. Audiences had stopped caring about the stories of rich and famous people such as had interested them in the 1960s, in the time of movies like The Carpetbaggers and Where Love Has Gone. In the end, the blockbuster films and special-effects films of the late 1970s attracted more viewers than the films about the decadent rich.

Vincent Canby of The New York Times called the film "as witless as it is gutless" and said it "recalls a sort of newspaper journalism you don't see much anymore — the Sunday supplement recapitulation of a famous murder, divorce or other scandal, put together, from morgue clips, and filled out by the writer with breathless speculation about what really might have happened and what really might have been said, always with more exclamation points than are absolutely necessary. It's the literature of vultures who have no interest in tearing into something of the first freshness."

Roger Ebert gave the film 2 stars out of 4 and wrote, "'The Greek Tycoon' was not made without a certain style, and it cost a lot of money, but watching it is somehow like witnessing a multimillion-dollar cinematic edition of the National Enquirer." Ebert went on to state, however, that "I must give credit where due: The role of the tycoon is wonderfully well-acted by Anthony Quinn, and the movie's good moments are all his."

"Hege" of Variety said, "It's a trashy, opulent, vulgar, racy $6.5 million picture. You've watched the headlines, now you can read the movie."

Gene Siskel of the Chicago Tribune awarded 3.5 stars out of 4 and wrote, "This one is easy to review. 'The Greek Tycoon,' a film a clef about Jackie Kennedy and Aristotle Onassis, is a lot of fun and it's great looking. And surprise—it's not tasteless." He also called Quinn "superb. He's vulgar, cunning, brutal, funny — a Zorba as captain of a multinational business. Everything about the character is correct."

Kevin Thomas of the Los Angeles Times wrote that "surprisingly enough, once past the obligatory gestures to the lavish jet set genre to which 'The Greek Tycoon' inevitably belongs, we're actually able to forget Quinn and Miss Bisset's real-life counterparts and become involved and even moved by a stormy-tender romance between two dramatic people. Writer Mort Fine, working from a story by him and others, and director J. Lee Thompson, who has a knack for drawing fine performances from actors regardless of a film's level or scope, has brought out the very best from Miss Bisset and especially Quinn."

Jack Kroll of Newsweek called it a "foul and sleazy film" that "is so awful you hate to use it to raise an ethical issue, but it does make you wonder just when sleaze curdles into slander - moral if not legal. You don't know whom to feel sorrier for, the bedeviled Jackie Onassis or the beautiful Jackie Bisset. Jackie O can't help being an American obsession, but Jackie B should have known better than to sign on this yacht of fools."

Gary Arnold of The Washington Post called the film "definitely on the blah side ... Producer Allen Klein and the hirelings responsible for 'The Greek Tycoon' lack the courage of their own tastelessness."

TV Guide rated the film one star and commented, "If you can't guess who the characters are in this, you must have been living on Mars for the last few decades . . . If scenery, greenery, and lavish living are what you like to see, you may enjoy The Greek Tycoon. If honesty, drama, and real feelings are more to your taste, read a book."

Time Out London called the film a "glossy travesty" and added, "Upmarket exploitation pics tend to make it (ie. profit) on the merest smell of money, sex and scandal, and this effort just reeks."

Box office
The film opened at number one in the United States and Canada and was number one the following week as well.

References

External links

1978 films
1978 drama films
American drama films
Films about businesspeople
Films about fictional presidents of the United States
Films about widowhood
American films based on actual events
Films directed by J. Lee Thompson
Films produced by Ely Landau
Films scored by Stanley Myers
Films shot at EMI-Elstree Studios
British drama films
Universal Pictures films
Films set in New York City
Films set in Washington, D.C.
Films set in London
Films set in Greece
Films shot in Greece
Films shot in Athens
Films shot in Corfu
Films à clef
Cultural depictions of John F. Kennedy
Cultural depictions of Robert F. Kennedy
Cultural depictions of Jacqueline Kennedy Onassis
Cultural depictions of Aristotle Onassis
Cultural depictions of Maria Callas
1970s English-language films
1970s American films
1970s British films